Qin Wenjun (born 1954) is an author of children's literature. She writes in Chinese.

Life and work
Qin Wenjun was born in Shanghai in 1954. In 1971, as one of the educated youth sent to work in the rural China, Qin was sent to a forested area in Daxing'an Ling Prefecture, Heilongjiang province, in north-east China. Her first publication was a novella "Shining Fireflies" (《闪亮的萤火虫》) in 1981. In 1984 she graduated from East China Normal University's Department of language and literature, and then worked as an editor at the Shanghai Children's Press (少年儿童出版社). She is now Director-General of the Shanghai Board on Books for Young People (SHBBY, part of IBBY), Vice President of the Shanghai Writers Association, and a National Committee Member of the China Writers Association. Qin's novels have been adapted for films and TV series, and have attained China's highest honours for film and TV series. Her works have been translated into English, Dutch, Japanese, Korean, and other languages.

While drawing on deep Chinese traditions, she has also laid new foundations for young readers.

Awards and honours (selection)
2017 Nominated for the 2018 Hans Christian Andersen Award.
2016 My Marble-Hearted Father won a Best Literary Work Award, at the 2016 Chen Bochui Children's Literature Awards
2002 Shortlisted for the Hans Christian Andersen Award
1999 Shortlisted for the Astrid Lindgren Memorial Award
1998 《四弟的绿庄园》 won the Bing Xin Children’s Literature Award (冰心儿童文学奖)
1997 《男生贾里》Jia Li won 1st prize in the National Outstanding Children’s Literature Award (China) (全国优秀少儿读物一等奖)
1997 《男生贾里》Jia Li awarded the China Writers Association Children's Literature Award (中国作家协会儿童文学奖)
1997 《男生贾里》Jia Li awarded the Shanghai City 3rd Children's Literature Award (上海市第三届文学艺术奖)
1997 《宝贝当家》 won the National (全国五个一工程奖)
1996 Won the :it:Premio Mondello Special Prize
1996 《家有小丑》 won the Taiwan Nine Songs Children's Literature Award (台湾九歌儿童文学奖)
1995 《秦文君中篇儿童小说选》 won the Taiwan Yang Huan Children's Literature Award (台湾杨唤儿童文学奖)

Books (selection)
Qin Wenjun has written over 50 books. The following translated titles are approximate:
《我是花木兰》I am Hua Mulan, illustrated by Yu Rong (Reycraft Books, 2019)
《会跳舞的向日葵》 translated into English as Aroma's Little Garden by Tony Blishen (2016)
《天棠街3号》 translated into English as 3 Tian Tang Street by Wu Xiaozhen
Curly the Black Goat, Hoopy the White Goat
《大狗喀啦克拉的公寓》 Smiling Kalakela 
Jia Li at Junior High (English translation by Belinda Yun-ying Louie and Douglas Heung Louie, 1997) 
《男生贾里全传》 The Complete Story of Jia Li
《一个女孩的心灵史》 The Mind of a Girl
《逃逃》 Taotao 
《调皮的日子》
《女生贾梅全传》
《小丫林晓梅》
《宝贝当家》
《小香咕系列》
Girl at Sixteen

See also

Interview with Shanghai Daily, 28 December 2014.
Qin Wenjun as a speaker at the Asian Festival of Children's Content, Singapore, 2015.
Qin Wenjun - biography and nomination for prize
Evaluating the work of Qin Wenjun, in Reading the World's Stories: An Annotated Bibliography of International Youth Literature edited by Annette Y. Goldsmith, Theo Heras, and Susan Corapi (Rowman & Littlefield, 11 Aug 2016), p. 17.
"Context and contradiction in translating Aroma’s Little Garden, by Qin Wenjun" - by Tony Blishen.

References

1954 births
Living people
Chinese children's writers
Chinese women children's writers
20th-century Chinese women writers
20th-century Chinese writers
21st-century Chinese women writers
21st-century Chinese writers